The Cataract Gorge is a river gorge in Launceston, Tasmania, Australia, approximately 1.5 km from the city centre. It is one of the region's premier tourist attractions with a Cataract Gorge boat trip leaving from Home Point Parade. It is found at the lower section of the South Esk River.

History 
The earliest known European visitor to the site was William Collins, who discovered its entrance in 1804.

A pathway, known as the King’s Bridge-Cataract Walk, and originally built by volunteers in the 1890s, runs along the north bank of the Cataract Gorge, and is a popular tourist destination. The original toll house at which pedestrians had to pay to enter the walk can still be seen near King's Bridge on the northern edge of the gorge.

The chairlift is the longest single-span chairlift in the world, with the longest span being .

It was washed away in the floods of 1929, rebuilt and then decommissioned when the Trevallyn Dam was finished in 1955. The building is now an interpretive museum.

Features 
The First Basin on the southern side features a swimming pool, the aforementioned chairlift, two cafés, a funicular railway and an open area surrounded by bushland. At the bottom of the funicular railways is a small cottage which contains photographs and paintings of the basin and downriver Gorge. The basin itself has created many of myths about its depth: some locals say it is a bottomless pit; a volcanic plug; or that a submarine sent in to find its bottom during the 1960s ran out cable before accomplishing this feat. In fact, the basin was formed by erosion at the intersection of two faults - the Basin Road Fault and an un-named fault approximately at right angles which the South Esk is following. Where the two faults meet, the Dolerite rock is badly shattered and hence more easily eroded, giving rise to the formation of the basin.

The northern side, named the Cliff Grounds, is a landscaped Victorian garden containing ferns, exotic plants and peacocks. It is now provided with facilities for visitors.

Further upstream is the historic Duck Reach Power Station, now an Interpretation Centre. The Launceston City Council originally commissioned the Power Station in 1893, making it the largest hydro-electric scheme of its day. By 1895 it was lighting the city.

Other activities include boat cruise through the accessible section of river, cable hang gliding experience that soars for 200 metres from a cliff top and rock climbing.

Prior to the development of the Trevallyn Dam there were three lesser basins upstream of the "First Basin", with the second and third still visible on a map, while the fourth is flooded by Lake Trevallyn.

At the lower end of the gorge, the South Esk spills into the Tamar River going under King's Bridge and Paterson Bridge which was built more recently. King's Bridge was the only bridge leading north out of the city for nearly 100 years. The Paterson Bridge was officially opened on November 2nd, 1973.

This section of river is a well recognised section of whitewater. It provides world class kayaking. An inaugural race is usually scheduled in late January, thanks to Hydro Tasmania.

Gallery

References

Further reading

External links
 
 Original video of the Cataract Gorge in flood, August 2009
 Photographs of Cataract Gorge - 1915

Canyons and gorges of Australia
Launceston, Tasmania
Tourist attractions in Tasmania
Tasmanian Heritage Register